Assisted reproductive technology (ART) includes medical procedures used primarily to address infertility. This subject involves procedures such as in vitro fertilization (IVF), intracytoplasmic sperm injection (ICSI), cryopreservation of gametes or embryos, and/or the use of fertility medication. When used to address infertility, ART may also be referred to as fertility treatment. ART mainly belongs to the field of reproductive endocrinology and infertility. Some forms of ART may be used with regard to fertile couples for genetic purpose (see preimplantation genetic diagnosis). ART may also be used in surrogacy arrangements, although not all surrogacy arrangements involve ART.
The existence of sterility will not always require ART to be the first option to consider, as there are occasions when its cause is a mild disorder that can be solved with more conventional treatments or with behaviors based on promoting health and reproductive habits.

Procedures

General 
With ART, the process of sexual intercourse is bypassed and fertilization of the oocytes occurs in the laboratory environment (i.e., in vitro fertilization).

In the US, the Centers for Disease Control and Prevention (CDC) defines ART to include "all fertility treatments in which both eggs and sperm are handled. In general, ART procedures involve surgically removing eggs from a woman's ovaries, combining them with sperm in the laboratory, and returning them to the woman's body or donating them to another woman." According to CDC, "they do not include treatments in which only sperm are handled (i.e., intrauterine—or artificial—insemination) or procedures in which a woman takes medicine only to stimulate egg production without the intention of having eggs retrieved."

In Europe, ART also excludes artificial insemination and includes only procedures where oocytes are handled.

The WHO, or World Health Organization, also defines ART this way.

Ovulation induction 

Ovulation induction is usually used in the sense of stimulation of the development of ovarian follicles by fertility medication to reverse anovulation or oligoovulation. These medications are given by injection for 8 to 14 days. A health care provider closely monitors the development of the eggs using transvaginal ultrasound and blood tests to assess follicle growth and estrogen production by the ovaries. When follicles have reached an adequate size and the eggs are mature enough, an injection of the hormone hCG initiates the ovulation process. Egg retrieval should occur from 34 to 36 hours after the hCG injection.

In vitro fertilization 

In vitro fertilization is the technique of letting fertilization of the male and female gametes (sperm and egg) occur outside the female body.

Techniques usually used in in vitro fertilization include:
 Transvaginal ovum retrieval (OVR) is the process whereby a small needle is inserted through the back of the vagina and guided via ultrasound into the ovarian follicles to collect the fluid that contains the eggs.
 Embryo transfer is the step in the process whereby one or several embryos are placed into the uterus of the female with the intent to establish a pregnancy.
Less commonly used techniques in in vitro fertilization are:
 Assisted zona hatching (AZH) is performed shortly before the embryo is transferred to the uterus. A small opening is made in the outer layer surrounding the egg in order to help the embryo hatch out and aid in the implantation process of the growing embryo.
  Intracytoplasmic sperm injection (ICSI) is beneficial in the case of male factor infertility where sperm counts are very low or failed fertilization occurred with previous IVF attempt(s). The ICSI procedure involves a single sperm carefully injected into the center of an egg using a microneedle. With ICSI, only one sperm per egg is needed. Without ICSI, you need between 50,000 and 100,000. This method is also sometimes employed when donor sperm is used.
 Autologous endometrial coculture is a possible treatment for patients who have failed previous IVF attempts or who have poor embryo quality. The patient's fertilized eggs are placed on top of a layer of cells from the patient's own uterine lining, creating a more natural environment for embryo development.
 In zygote intrafallopian transfer (ZIFT), egg cells are removed from the woman's ovaries and fertilized in the laboratory; the resulting zygote is then placed into the fallopian tube.
 Cytoplasmic transfer is the technique in which the contents of a fertile egg from a donor are injected into the infertile egg of the patient along with the sperm.
 Egg donors are resources for women with no eggs due to surgery, chemotherapy, or genetic causes; or with poor egg quality, previously unsuccessful IVF cycles or advanced maternal age. In the egg donor process, eggs are retrieved from a donor's ovaries, fertilized in the laboratory with the sperm from the recipient's partner, and the resulting healthy embryos are returned to the recipient's uterus.
 Sperm donation may provide the source for the sperm used in IVF procedures where the male partner produces no sperm or has an inheritable disease, or where the woman being treated has no male partner.
 Preimplantation genetic diagnosis (PGD) involves the use of genetic screening mechanisms such as fluorescent in-situ hybridization (FISH) or comparative genomic hybridization (CGH) to help identify genetically abnormal embryos and improve healthy outcomes.
 Embryo splitting can be used for twinning to increase the number of available embryos.

Pre-implantation genetic diagnosis 
A pre-implantation genetic diagnosis procedure may be conducted on embryos prior to implantation (as a form of embryo profiling), and sometimes even of oocytes prior to fertilization. PGD is considered in a similar fashion to prenatal diagnosis. PGD is an adjunct to ART procedures, and requires in vitro fertilization to obtain oocytes or embryos for evaluation. Embryos are generally obtained through blastomere or blastocyst biopsy. The latter technique has proved to be less deleterious for the embryo, therefore it is advisable to perform the biopsy around day 5 or 6 of development. Sex selection is the attempt to control the sex of offspring to achieve a desired sex in case of X chromosome linked diseases. It can be accomplished in several ways, both pre- and post-implantation of an embryo, as well as at birth. Pre-implantation techniques include PGD, but also sperm sorting.

Others 
Other assisted reproduction techniques include:
 Mitochondrial replacement therapy (MRT, sometimes called mitochondrial donation) is the replacement of mitochondria in one or more cells to prevent or ameliorate disease. MRT originated as a special form of IVF in which some or all of the future baby's mitochondrial DNA comes from a third party. This technique is used in cases when mothers carry genes for mitochondrial diseases. The therapy is approved for use in the United Kingdom.
 In gamete intrafallopian transfer (GIFT) a mixture of sperm and eggs is placed directly into a woman's fallopian tubes using laparoscopy following a transvaginal ovum retrieval.
 Reproductive surgery, treating e.g. fallopian tube obstruction and vas deferens obstruction, or reversing a vasectomy by a reverse vasectomy. In surgical sperm retrieval (SSR) the reproductive urologist obtains sperm from the vas deferens, epididymis or directly from the testis in a short outpatient procedure.
 By cryopreservation, eggs, sperm and reproductive tissue can be preserved for later IVF.

Risks 
The majority of IVF-conceived infants do not have birth defects.
However, some studies have suggested that assisted reproductive technology is associated with an increased risk of birth defects.
Artificial reproductive technology is becoming more available. Early studies suggest that there could be an increased risk for medical complications with both the mother and baby. Some of these include low birth weight, placental insufficiency, chromosomal disorders, preterm deliveries, gestational diabetes, and pre-eclampsia (Aiken and Brockelsby).

In the largest U.S. study, which used data from a statewide registry of birth defects,
6.2% of IVF-conceived children had major defects, as compared with 4.4% of naturally conceived children matched for maternal age and other factors (odds ratio, 1.3; 95% confidence interval, 1.00 to 1.67). ART carries with it a risk for heterotopic pregnancy (simultaneous intrauterine and extrauterine pregnancy).
The main risks are:
 Genetic disorders
 Low birth weight. In IVF and ICSI, a risk factor is the decreased expression of proteins in energy metabolism; Ferritin light chain and ATP5A1.
 Preterm birth. Low birth weight and preterm birth are strongly associated with many health problems, such as visual impairment and cerebral palsy. Children born after IVF are roughly twice as likely to have cerebral palsy.

Sperm donation is an exception, with a birth defect rate of almost a fifth compared to the general population. It may be explained by that sperm banks accept only people with high sperm count.

Germ cells of the mouse normally have a frequency of spontaneous point mutations that is 5 to 10-fold lower than that in somatic cells from the same individual.  This low frequency in the germline leads to embryos that have a low frequency of point mutations in the next generation.  No significant differences were observed in the frequency or spectrum of mutations between naturally conceived fetuses and assisted-conception fetuses.  This suggests that with respect to the maintenance of genetic integrity assisted conception is safe.

Current data indicate little or no increased risk for postpartum depression among women who use ART.

Usage of assisted reproductive technology including ovarian stimulation and in vitro fertilization have been associated with an increased overall risk of childhood cancer in the offspring, which may be caused by the same original disease or condition that caused the infertility or subfertility in the mother or father.

That said, In a landmark paper by Jacques Balayla et al. it was determined that infants born after ART have similar neurodevelopment than infants born after natural conception.

ART may also pose risks to the mother. A large US database study compared pregnancy outcomes among 106,000 assisted conception pregnancies with 34 million natural conception pregnancies. It found that assisted conception pregnancies were associated with an increased risk of cardiovascular diseases, including acute kidney injury and arrhythmia. Assisted conception pregnancies were also associated with a higher risk of caesarean delivery and premature birth. 

In theory, ART can solve almost all reproductive problems, except for severe pathology or the absence of a uterus (or womb), using specific gamete or embryo donation techniques. However, this does not mean that all women can be treated with assisted reproductive techniques, or that all women who are treated will achieve pregnancy.

Usage 
As a result of the 1992 Fertility Clinic Success Rate and Certification Act, the CDC is required to publish the annual ART success rates at U.S. fertility clinics. Assisted reproductive technology procedures performed in the U.S. has over than doubled over the last 10 years, with 140,000 procedures in 2006, resulting in 55,000 births.

In Australia, 3.1% of births are a result of ART.

The most common reasons for discontinuation of fertility treatment have been estimated to be: postponement of treatment (39%), physical and psychological burden (19%), psychological burden (14%), physical burden (6.32%), relational and personal problems (17%), personal reasons (9%), relational problems (9%), treatment rejection (13%) and organizational (12%) and clinic (8%) problems.

By country

United States 
Many Americans do not have insurance coverage for fertility investigations and treatments. Many states are starting to mandate coverage, and the rate of use is 278% higher in states with complete coverage.

There are some health insurance companies that cover diagnosis of infertility, but frequently once diagnosed will not cover any treatment costs.

 Initial workup: hysteroscopy, hysterosalpingogram, blood tests ~$
 Sonohysterogram (SHG) ~ $–$
 Clomiphene citrate cycle ~ $–$
 IVF cycle ~ $–$
 Use of a surrogate mother to carry the child – dependent on arrangements

Another way to look at costs is to determine the expected cost of establishing a pregnancy. Thus, if a clomiphene treatment has a chance to establish a pregnancy in 8% of cycles and costs $, the expected cost is $ to establish a pregnancy, compared to an IVF cycle (cycle fecundity 40%) with a corresponding expected cost of $ ($ × 40%).

For the community as a whole, the cost of IVF on average pays back by 700% by tax from future employment by the conceived human being.

European Union

In Europe, 157,500 children were born using assisted reproductive technology in 2015, according to the European Society of Human Reproduction and Embryology (ESHRE). But there are major differences in legislation across the Old Continent.
A European directive fixes standards concerning the use of human tissue and cells, but all ethical and legal questions on ART remain the prerogative of EU member states.

Across Europe, the legal criteria per availability vary somewhat. In 11 countries all women may benefit; in 8 others only heterosexual couples are concerned; in 7 only single women; and in 2 (Austria and Germany) only lesbian couples.
Spain was the first European country to open ART to all women, in 1977, the year the first sperm bank was opened there. In France, the right to ART is accorded to all women since 2019. In the last 15 years, legislation has evolved quickly. For example, Portugal made ART available in 2006 with conditions very similar to those in France, before amending the law in 2016 to allow lesbian couples and single women to benefit. Italy clarified its uncertain legal situation in 2004 by adopting Europe's strictest laws: ART is only available to heterosexual couples, married or otherwise, and sperm donation is prohibited.

Today, 21 countries provide partial public funding for ART treatment. The seven others, which do not, are Ireland, Cyprus, Estonia, Latvia, Luxembourg, Malta, and Romania.
Such subsidies are subject to conditions, however. In Belgium, a fixed payment of €1,073 is made for each full cycle of the IVF process. The woman must be aged under 43 and may not carry out more than six cycles of ART. There is also a limit on the number of transferable embryos, which varies according to age and the number of cycles completed.
In France, ART is subsidized in full by national health insurance for women up to age 43, with limits of 4 attempts at IVF and 6 at artificial insemination.
Germany tightened its conditions for public funding in 2004, which caused a sharp drop in the number of ART cycles carried out, from more than 102,000 in 2003 to fewer than 57,000 the following year. Since then the figure has remained stable.

17 countries limit access to ART according to the age of the woman. 10 countries have established an upper age limit, varying from 40 (Finland, Netherlands) to 50 (including Spain, Greece and Estonia).
Since 1994, France is one of a number of countries (including Germany, Spain, and the UK) which use the somewhat vague notion of "natural age of procreation". In 2017, the steering council of France's Agency of Biomedicine established an age limit of 43 for women using ART.
10 countries have no age limit for ART. These include Austria, Hungary, Italy and Poland.

Most European countries allow donations of gametes by third parties. But the situations vary depending on whether sperm or eggs are concerned. Sperm donations are authorized in 20 EU member states; in 11 of them anonymity is allowed. Egg donations are possible in 17 states, including 8 under anonymous conditions.
On 12 April, the Council of Europe adopted a recommendation which encourages an end to anonymity. In the UK, anonymous sperm donations ended in 2005 and children have access to the identity of the donor when they reach adulthood.
In France, the principle of anonymous donations of sperm or embryos is maintained in the law of bioethics of 2011, but a new bill under discussion may change the situation.

United Kingdom 
In the United Kingdom, all patients have the right to preliminary testing, provided free of charge by the National Health Service (NHS). However, treatment is not widely available on the NHS and there can be long waiting lists. Many patients therefore pay for immediate treatment within the NHS or seek help from private clinics.

In 2013, the National Institute for Health and Care Excellence (NICE) published new guidelines about who should have access to IVF treatment on the NHS in England and Wales.

The guidelines say women aged between 40 and 42 should be offered one cycle of IVF on the NHS if they have never had IVF treatment before, have no evidence of low ovarian reserve (this is when eggs in the ovary are low in number, or low in quality), and have been informed of the additional implications of IVF and pregnancy at this age. However, if tests show IVF is the only treatment likely to help them get pregnant, women should be referred for IVF straight away.

This policy is often modified by local Clinical Commissioning Groups, in a fairly blatant breach of the NHS Constitution for England which provides that patients have the right to drugs and treatments that have been recommended by NICE for use in the NHS. For example, the Cheshire, Merseyside and West Lancashire Clinical Commissioning Group insists on additional conditions:
 The person undergoing treatment must have commenced treatment before her 40th birthday;
 The person undergoing treatment must have a BMI of between 19 and 29;
 Neither partner must have any living children, from either the current or previous relationships. This includes adopted as well as biological children; and,
 Sub-fertility must not be the direct result of a sterilisation procedure in either partner (this does not include conditions where sterilisation occurs as a result of another medical problem). Couples who have undertaken a reversal of their sterilisation procedure are not eligible for treatment.

Canada 

Some treatments are covered by OHIP (public health insurance) in Ontario and others are not. Women with bilaterally blocked fallopian tubes and are under the age of 40 have treatment covered but are still required to pay test fees (around CA$3,000–4,000). Coverage varies in other provinces. Most other patients are required to pay for treatments themselves.

Israel 
Israel's national health insurance, which is mandatory for all Israeli citizens, covers nearly all fertility treatments. IVF costs are fully subsidized up to the birth of two children for all Israeli women, including single women and lesbian couples. Embryo transfers for purposes of gestational surrogacy are also covered.

Germany 
On 27 January 2009, the Federal Constitutional Court ruled that it is unconstitutional, that the health insurance companies have to bear only 50% of the cost for IVF. On 2 March 2012, the Federal Council has approved a draft law of some federal states, which provides that the federal government provides a subsidy of 25% to the cost. Thus, the share of costs borne for the pair would drop to just 25%. Since July 2017, assisted reproductive technology is also allowed for married lesbian couples, as German parliament allowed same-sex marriages in Germany.

France 
In July 2020, the French Parliament allowed assisted reproductive technology also for lesbian couples and single women.

Cuba 
Cuban sources mention that assisted reproduction is completely legal and free in the country.

India 
The Government of India has notified the Surrogacy (Regulation) Act 2021 and the Assisted Reproductive Technology (Regulation) Act 2021 to regulate the practice of ART. Prior to that, the National Guidelines for Accreditation, Supervision and Regulation of ART Clinics in India published by the Ministry for Health and Family Welfare, Government of India in the year 2005 was governing the field. Indian law recognises the right of a single woman, who is a major, to have children through ART.

Society and culture

Ethics 

Some couples may find it difficult to stop treatment despite very bad prognosis, resulting in futile therapies. This has the potential to give ART providers a difficult decision of whether to continue or refuse treatment.

Some assisted reproductive technologies have the potential to be harmful to both the mother and child, posing a psychological and/or physical health risk, which may impact the ongoing use of these treatments.

In Israel, there is research supporting using art, including recycled lab materials from the IVF process, to help women work through some of these mixed emotions.

Fictional representation 
Films and other fiction depicting emotional struggles of assisted reproductive technology have had an upswing in the latter part of the 2000s decade, although the techniques have been available for decades. As ART becomes more utilized, the number of people that can relate to it by personal experience in one way or another is growing.

For specific examples, refer to the fiction sections in individual subarticles, e.g. surrogacy, sperm donation and fertility clinic.

In addition, reproduction and pregnancy in speculative fiction has been present for many decades.

Historical facts
25 July 1978, Louise Brown was born; this was the first successful birth of a child after IVF treatment. The procedure took place at Dr Kershaw's Cottage Hospital (now Dr Kershaw's Hospice) in Royton, Oldham, England. Patrick Steptoe (gynaecologist) and Robert Edwards (physiologist) worked together to develop the IVF technique. Steptoe described a new method of egg extraction and Edwards were carrying out a way to fertilise eggs in the lab. Robert G. Edwards was awarded the Nobel Prize in Physiology or Medicine in 2010, but not Steptoe because the Nobel Prize is not awarded posthumously.

The first successful birth by ICSI (Intracytoplasmic sperm injection) took place on 14 January 1992. The technique was developed by Gianpiero D. Palermo at the Vrije Universiteit Brussel, in the Center for Reproductive Medicine in Brussels. Actually, the discovery was made by a mistake when a spermatozoid was put into the cytoplasm.

See also 

 Artificial uterus
 Artificial insemination
 Diethylstilbestrol
 Embryo
 Fertility fraud
 Human cloning
 Religious response to ART
 Ova bank
 Sperm bank
 Sperm donation
 Spontaneous conception, the unassisted conception of a subsequent child after prior use of assisted reproductive technology
 Egg donation
 Ralph L. Brinster

References

External links 
 Centers for Disease Control and Prevention (CDC), Assisted Reproductive Technology

 
Applied genetics
Biotechnology
Bioethics
Eugenics
Emerging technologies
Fertility medicine
Genetic engineering
Human reproduction
Ideologies
Liberalism
Medical ethics
Obstetrical procedures
Reproductive rights
Social philosophy
Social theories
Transhumanism